The Jornada del Muerto Volcano is a small shield volcano and lava field in central New Mexico, about  in size and reaching an elevation of .  Jornada del Muerto means "Dead Man's Route" in Spanish, referring to the desolate colonial era trail from New Spain through this Malpaís region.

Geography
The volcano and lava field is located at the northern end of the Jornada del Muerto Desert basin in the Basin and Range Province.  The Jornada del Muerto basin runs between the Oscura Mountains and San Andres Mountains on the east, with the Caballo Mountains and the Fra Cristóbal Range on the west.

Geology

Volcano and cones
Within the outer cone are a series of nested spatter cones interspersed with lava pools.

Volcanic field
The volcano erupted about 760,000 years ago in a series of basaltic flows. It produced a slow and viscous ʻaʻā lava volcanic field which has a very rough and uneven surface, making travel across it extremely difficult and hazardous; also time consuming.

The largest individual flow-field extends from a center in extreme southeastern Socorro County and extends into Sierra County.  Currently the flow forms the east bank of the Rio Grande from Fra Cristóbal north to Fort Craig, but at the time of eruption it temporarily dammed the Rio Grande.

See also
Carrizozo Malpais

References

Further reading
 Crumpler, L. S., and J. C. Aubele, (1990), Jornada del Muerto, New Mexico, in Volcanoes of North America, C. A. Wood and J. Kienle. eds., Cambridge University Press, Cambridge, p. 309-310.

External links
 

Volcanoes of New Mexico
Mountains of New Mexico
Malpaíses (landform)
Pleistocene shield volcanoes
Shield volcanoes of the United States
Lava fields
Landforms of Socorro County, New Mexico
Quaternary United States
Tularosa Basin
Mountains of Socorro County, New Mexico